Gaelic law may refer to:

 Early Irish law
 Alternative law in Ireland prior to 1921 
 Manx law
Law of the Brets and Scots